The  was the fifth season of the nationwide fourth tier of Japanese football, and the 20th season since the establishment of Japan Football League. The season ran from 11 March to 18 November 2018.

Clubs
Sixteen clubs participated in this season of Japan Football League. The list was announced on 15 January 2018.

Personnel and kits

Change in rules
This season was the last to use the two-stage format, similar to the one J.League had in its early years and used in 2015 and 2016. Two single round-robin stages were held, and winners of each stage determined the champion in the post-season home and away championship playoffs. After five seasons, the JFL reverted to a one-stage double round-robin starting in 2019.

League table

Top scorers
.

Attendances

Promotion from Regional Leagues
Matsue City and Suzuka Unlimited

References

External links
Official Site (in Japanese)

Japan Football League seasons
3